Lincombian-Ranisian-Jerzmanowician (LRJ) was a culture or technocomplex (industry) dating to the beginning Upper Paleolithic, about 43,000 years ago. It is characterised by leaf points made on long blades, which are thought to have been made by the last Neanderthals, although some researchers have suggested that it could be a culture of the first anatomically modern humans in Europe. 
It is rarely found, but extends across northwest Europe from Wales to Poland.

Major sites

The technocomplex is named after findings in Kents Cavern, Lincombe Hill, Torquay (Devon, England), the cave of Ilsenhöhle in Ranis (Thuringia, Germany), and the Jerzmanowicien cave in Ojców (Kraków County, Poland). About 40 different sites have been identified.

See also 
 Transitional cultures : Châtelperronian - Uluzzian - Bohunician - Szeletian
 Follow-on cultures : Gravettian - Sungir - Kostenki
 Haplogroup I-M170

References

Archaeological cultures of Europe
Upper Paleolithic cultures of Europe
Archaeological cultures in Germany
Archaeological cultures in Poland
Archaeology of Wales
Peopling of Europe
Industries (archaeology)